Vahid Hambo (born 3 February 1995) is a Finnish footballer of Bosnian descent who plays as a striker for IFK Mariehamn. He has been described as a tall, powerful player.

Club career

Early years
Born in Helsinki to Bosnian parents, he played with his local team, HJK's youth sides before switching to Sampdoria's Primavera team. His time in Italy was blighted by injuries, and after two years his contract was terminated by mutual consent, after scoring only once in 23 games.

Ilves and Inter Turku
After his departure from Sampdoria, Hambo signed for Ilves in the Finnish second division, Ykkönen. He impressed and was quickly grabbed by Inter Turku in the top-flight Veikkausliiga. His good form continued, but  injuries limited his playing time, making only 6 appearances in the league. Despite this, he was hailed as one of Inter's best players.

Brighton
Still recovering from a knee injury, Hambo signed for Brighton & Hove Albion in the English Championship, joining fellow Finn Niki Mäenpää. The club's officials stated that Hambo would start playing for the reserve team firstly, to get him known to English football better and help recover from his injury.

SJK
On 19 July 2017, Hambo returned to Finland, signing for Veikkausliiga club SJK until the end of the 2018 season.

RoPS
Hambo signed with RoPS in August 2018, but left the club again after the season.

Astra Giurgiu
On 7 February 2019 Vahid Hambo signed a contract, valid for two years and a half, with Romanian side FC Astra Giurgiu.

Sūduva
On 12 September 2019 he became a member of Lithuanian FK Sūduva Marijampolė.

International career
Hambo has appeared for Finnish under 21-side. He was also selected for a match for the senior side in the 2016 Euro's qualifying, but had to withdraw due to his injury.

Honours
Astra Giurgiu
Cupa României: Runner-up 2018–19

External links
 
  Profile at veikkausliiga.com
 Vahid Hambo | Twentyfour Management

References

Living people
1995 births
Footballers from Helsinki
Finnish people of Bosnia and Herzegovina descent
Finnish footballers
Finland youth international footballers
Finland under-21 international footballers
Association football forwards
Klubi 04 players
U.C. Sampdoria players
FC Ilves players
FC Inter Turku players
Brighton & Hove Albion F.C. players
Seinäjoen Jalkapallokerho players
SJK Akatemia players
Rovaniemen Palloseura players
FC Astra Giurgiu players
IFK Mariehamn players
Kakkonen players
Ykkönen players
Veikkausliiga players
Liga I players
Finnish expatriate footballers
Finnish expatriate sportspeople in Italy
Expatriate footballers in Italy
Finnish expatriate sportspeople in England
Expatriate footballers in England
Finnish expatriate sportspeople in Romania
Expatriate footballers in Romania